Joseph W. Brackett was a Democratic member of the Wisconsin State Assembly during the 1st Wisconsin Legislature in 1848. Brackett was born in Lancaster, New Hampshire in 1800 and died on November 5, 1873. His son, James, would hold various public offices.

References

See also

People from Lancaster, New Hampshire
1800 births
1873 deaths
Burials in Wisconsin
19th-century American politicians
Democratic Party members of the Wisconsin State Assembly